Maher Bitar is a National Security Council official in the United States. He served during Barack Obama's administration and Joe Biden's. He is Palestinian.

Bihar has a Master's degree from Oxford University. He studied at Georgetown Law School. He was a legal representative for U.S. Representative Adam Schiff.

He succeeds Michael Ellis.

He has written about political organizing among Palestinian refugees. He has worked for the U.S. government since 2011 when he was a student trainee.

Normam Eisen's book about the first impeachment of U.S. president Donald Trump describes him.

References

Year of birth missing (living people)
Living people
American people of Palestinian descent
Alumni of the University of Oxford
Georgetown University Law Center alumni